Sphere On Tour is a live album by the group Sphere featuring saxophonist Charlie Rouse, pianist Kenny Barron, bassist Buster Williams, and drummer Ben Riley, recorded in Italy in 1985 and released on the Italian Red label.

Reception 

In his review on Allmusic, Ron Wynn noted: "Sphere was one of the great repertory groups to emerge in the '80s."

Track listing 
 "Dual Force" (Buster Williams) – 7:40
 "A Beautiful Friendship" (Donald Kahn, Stanley Styne) – 10:10
 "Scratch" (Kenny Barron) – 7:45
 "Tayamisha" (Williams) – 5:15
 "Spiral" (Barron) – 11:00
 "Well, You Needn't" (Thelonious Monk) – 8:20

Personnel 
Charlie Rouse – tenor saxophone
Kenny Barron – piano
Buster Williams – bass
Ben Riley – drums

References 

Sphere (American band) live albums
1988 live albums
Red Records live albums